Julien Royer (born 1 September 1982) is a French chef and restaurant owner. He is the Chef-owner of Odette in Singapore and Louise in Hong Kong. in 2019, Odette was awarded the highest distinction of 3 Michelin stars by the Michelin guide. Royer was born in Cantal, Central France to fourth-generation farmers.

Early career 
As a teenager, Royer's first job in the food industry was working for Michel Bras at Restaurant Bras in Laguiole, France. Later on, he moved to Durtol, a commune in Auvergne, Central France, where he worked for Les Maîtres Cuisiniers de France association member, Bernard Andrieux. In 2008, Royer moved to Singapore, where he served as Chef de cuisine at Brasserie Les Saveurs at the St Regis Hotel. In 2011, Royer served as Chef de cuisine at JAAN at Swissôtel The Stamford for 4 years before leaving to becoming Chef-owner of Odette in 2015.

Restaurants owned and/or operated by Royer

Odette
Odette is a three Michelin star restaurant owned and operated by Royer in collaboration with The Lo & Behold Group. The restaurant is located within the National Gallery Singapore. It opened in 2015 and was Royer's first solo restaurant.

Louise 
Louise is a Michelin star restaurant owned and operated by Royer, in collaboration with JIA Group and The Lo & Behold Group, located at PMQ, Hong Kong. It was opened in 2019 and received its first Michelin star in 2020.

Claudine 
Claudine is a French restaurant that opened on November 16, 2021. Located on Harding Road in an old chapel, Claudine is the successor to The White Rabbit, a restaurant opened by the Lo & Behold Group in 2008 that closed after April 30, 2021.

Awards

Odette 
Michelin Guide2016, 2017, 2018 Michelin Guide: Two Michelin Stars

2019 Michelin Guide: Three Michelin Stars

The World's 50 Best2018 The World's 50 Best Restaurants: Number 28; 2019,  Number 18

Asia's 50 Best2017 Asia's 50 Best Restaurants: Number 9;
2018, Number 5;  2019,  Number 1; 2020, Number 1

La Liste

2017, 2018, 2019 La Liste: 88.50,; 2020,  94.00

T.Dining Singapore

2017, 2018, 2019 Best Restaurant Awards: Best Service, Restaurant of the Year, Best Interior Design & Top 20 Restaurants

Wallpaper* Design Awards

2017: Best New Restaurant

Singapore Tourism Awards

2016: Best Dining Experience

Louise 
Michelin Guide
2020 Michelin Guide: One Michelin Star, Louise

References 

1982 births
Living people
French chefs
French restaurateurs